Mervan Scanlan (8 December 1902 – 16 November 1941) was an Australian rules footballer who played with South Melbourne in the Victorian Football League (VFL).

Scanlan was appointed as coach of the Tungamah Football Club in 1925. 

Scanlan died after falling from a bus in South Melbourne on 16 November 1941. He is buried at Fawkner Cemetery.

Notes

External links 

1902 births
1941 deaths
Australian rules footballers from Victoria (Australia)
Sydney Swans players